The Brazil nut (Bertholletia excelsa) is a South American tree in the family Lecythidaceae, and it is also the name of the tree's commercially harvested edible seeds. It is one of the largest and longest-lived trees in the Amazon rainforest. As food, Brazil nuts are notable for diverse content of micronutrients, especially a high amount of selenium. The wood of the Brazil nut tree is prized for its quality in carpentry, flooring, and heavy construction.

Common names

In Brazil, they are more commonly called "" (meaning "chestnuts from Pará" in Portuguese), with other names also used.

In North America, as early as 1896, Brazil nuts were sometimes known by the slang term "nigger toes", a vulgarity that gradually fell out of use as the racial slur became socially unacceptable.

Taxonomy 
The Brazil nut family, the Lecythidaceae, is in the order Ericales, as are other well-known plants such as blueberries, cranberries, sapote, gutta-percha, tea, phlox, and persimmons. The tree is the only species in the monotypic genus Bertholletia, named after French chemist Claude Louis Berthollet.

Description 

It may live for 500 years or more, and can often reach a thousand years of age. The stem is straight and commonly without branches for well over half the tree's height, with a large, emergent crown of long branches above the surrounding canopy of other trees.

The bark is grayish and smooth.

Range

The Brazil nut is native to the Guianas, Venezuela, Brazil, eastern Colombia, eastern Peru, and eastern Bolivia. It occurs as scattered trees in large forests on the banks of the Amazon River, Rio Negro, Tapajós, and the Orinoco. The fruit is heavy and rigid; when the fruits fall, they pose a serious threat to vehicles and potential for traumatic brain injury of people passing under the tree.

Reproduction

Brazil nut trees produce fruit almost exclusively in pristine forests, as disturbed forests lack the large-bodied bees of the genera Bombus, Centris, Epicharis, Eulaema, and Xylocopa, which are the only ones capable of pollinating the tree's flowers, with different bee genera being the primary pollinators in different areas, and different times of year. Brazil nuts have been harvested from plantations, but production is low and is currently not economically viable.

The fruit takes 14 months to mature after pollination of the flowers. Up to three whorls can be stacked onto each other, with the polar ends of the segments of the middle whorl nestling into the upper and lower whorls (see illustration above).

The capsule contains a small hole at one end, which enables large rodents like the agouti to gnaw it open. They then eat some of the seeds inside while burying others for later use; some of these are able to germinate into new Brazil nut trees. Most of the seeds are "planted" by the agoutis in caches during wet season, and the young saplings may have to wait years, in a state of dormancy, for a tree to fall and sunlight to reach it, when it starts growing again. Capuchin monkeys have been reported to open Brazil nuts using a stone as an anvil.

Society and culture
In Brazil, cutting down a Brazil nut tree (typically with the intent of harvesting lumber and Brazil nuts) is illegal, unless done with previous authorization from the Brazilian Institute of Environment and Renewable Natural Resources.

Production

In 2020, global production of Brazil nuts (in shells) was 69,658 tonnes, most of which derive from wild harvests in tropical forests, especially the Amazon regions of Brazil and Bolivia which produced 92% of the world total (table).

Environmental effects of harvesting
Since most of the production for international trade is harvested in the wild, the business arrangement has been advanced as a model for generating income from a tropical forest without destroying it. The nuts are most often gathered by migrant workers known as castañeros (in Spanish) or castanheiros (in Portuguese). Logging is a significant threat to the sustainability of the Brazil nut-harvesting industry.

Analysis of tree ages in areas that are harvested shows that moderate and intense gathering takes so many seeds that not enough are left to replace older trees as they die. Sites with light gathering activities had many young trees, while sites with intense gathering practices had nearly none.

European Union import regulation 

In 2003, the European Union imposed strict regulations on the import of Brazilian-harvested Brazil nuts in their shells, as the shells are considered to contain unsafe levels of aflatoxins, a potential cause of liver cancer.

Nutrition and human consumption

Brazil nuts are 3% water, 14% protein, 12% carbohydrates, and 66% fats (table). The fat components are 16% saturated, 24% monounsaturated, and 24% polyunsaturated (see table for USDA source).

In a 100 gram (3.5 oz) reference amount, Brazil nuts supply 659 calories, and are a rich source (20% or more of the Daily Value, DV) of dietary fiber (30% DV), thiamin (54% DV), vitamin E (38% DV), magnesium (106% DV), phosphorus (104% DV), manganese (57% DV), and zinc (43% DV). Calcium, iron, and potassium are present in moderate amounts (10-19% DV, table).

Selenium

Brazil nuts are a particularly rich source of selenium, with just  supplying 544 micrograms of selenium or 10 times the DV of 55 micrograms (see table for USDA source).  However, the amount of selenium within batches of nuts may vary considerably.

The high selenium content is used as a biomarker in studies of selenium intake and deficiency. Consumption of just one Brazil nut per day over 8 weeks was sufficient to restore selenium blood levels and increase HDL cholesterol in obese women.

Phytochemicals
Brazil nuts are susceptible to contamination by aflatoxins, produced by fungi, once they fall to the ground. Aflatoxins can cause liver damage, including possible cancer, if consumed. Aflatoxin levels have been found in Brazil nuts during inspections that were far higher than the limits set by the EU. However, mechanical sorting and drying was found to eliminate 98% of aflatoxins; a 2003 EU ban on importation was rescinded after new tolerance levels were set.

This level of radium is small, although it can be about 1,000 times higher than in other common foods. According to Oak Ridge Associated Universities, elevated levels of radium in the soil does not directly cause the concentration of radium, but "the very extensive root system of the tree" can concentrate naturally occurring radioactive material, when present in the soil. Radium can be concentrated in nuts only if it is present in the soil.

Brazil nuts also contain barium, a metal with a chemical behavior quite similar to radium. While Barium, if ingested, can have toxic effects, such as weakness, vomiting or diarrhea, the amount present in brazil nuts are orders of magnitude too small to have noticeable health affects.

Uses

Oil

Brazil nut oil contains 48% unsaturated fatty acids composed mainly of oleic and linoleic acids, the phytosterol, beta-sitosterol, and fat-soluble vitamin E.

The following table presents the composition of fatty acids in Brazil nut oil (see USDA source in nutrition table):

Wood
The lumber from Brazil nut trees (not to be confused with Brazilwood) is of excellent quality, having diverse uses from flooring to heavy construction. Logging the trees is prohibited by law in all three producing countries (Brazil, Bolivia, and Peru). Illegal extraction of timber and land clearances present continuing threats.

Other uses
Brazil nut oil is used as a lubricant in clocks, in the manufacturing of paint and cosmetics, such as soap and perfume. Because of its hardness, the Brazil nutshell is often pulverized and used as an abrasive to polish materials, such as metals and ceramics, in the same way as a jeweler's rouge. The charcoal from the nut shells may be used to purify water.

Gallery

See also
 Brazil nut cake
 List of culinary nuts
 Official list of endangered flora of Brazil
 Granular convection

References

Lecythidaceae
Trees of the Amazon
Edible nuts and seeds
Fruit trees
Trees of Brazil
Trees of Bolivia
Trees of Colombia
Trees of Guyana
Trees of Peru
Trees of Venezuela
Tropical agriculture
Crops originating from South America
Crops originating from Brazil
Crops originating from Bolivia
Crops originating from Peru
Crops originating from Colombia
Flora of the Amazon
Vulnerable flora of South America
Taxa named by Aimé Bonpland
Taxa named by Alexander von Humboldt